Karen Nussbaum (born April 25, 1950) is an American labor leader and founding director of Working America.

Biography 
Nussbaum was born in Chicago where her mother, Annette Brenner Nussbaum, was a publicist and father, Mike Nussbaum, was an exterminator, actor, and director. Her parents were active in the anti-Vietnam movement and worked to bring speakers to their community of Highland Park in Chicago including Staughton Lynd. During this time, the family was also receiving hate mail from the local John Birch Society. She enrolled in the University of Chicago in 1968 but dropped out to move to Boston and work in the anti-Vietnam movement. While in Boston, she began working as a clerical worker at Harvard where she was exposed to inequalities in the workplace for female office workers. In 1975, she earned a B.A. from Goddard College.

In 1973, she co-founded 9to5, an organization that addressed issues female office workers faced, eventually helping create a union for female office workers in 1975.  In 1977, 9to5 merged with Cleveland Women Working to create a national coalition of like-minded associations, the Cleveland-based Working Women Organizing Project, headed by Nussbaum. In 1981, 9to5 worked as a partner with the Service Employees International Union (SEIU) known as District 925. She served as director from 1981 to 1993.

During the Clinton Administration, Nussbaum served as the director of the Women's Bureau, in the United States Department of Labor from 1993 to 1996. As director of the Women’s Bureau, she surveyed working women about their jobs and initiated programs in response to their concerns.

Nussbaum is the founding director of Working America, a community affiliate of the AFL–CIO. She co-founded the organization in 2003 and formerly served as executive director.

She was inducted into the Ohio Women’s Hall of Fame in 1984.

See also

9to5, National Association of Working Women

References

External links

American trade union leaders
Living people
1950 births
Ohio Democrats
Clinton administration personnel
People from Chicago
United States Department of Labor officials